Orania is a genus of sea snails, marine gastropod mollusks in the subfamily Ergalataxinae of the family Muricidae, the murex snails or rock snails.

Species
Species within the genus Orania include:
 Orania adiastolos Houart, 1995
 Orania archaea Houart, 1995
 Orania atea Houart & Tröndlé, 2008
 Orania badia (Reeve, 1845)
 Orania bimucronata (Reeve, 1846)
 Orania birileffi (Lischke, 1871)
 Orania carnicolor (Bozzetti, 2009)
 Orania castanea (Küster, 1859)
 † Orania cheilotoma (Hoernes & Auinger, 1890) 
 Orania corallina (Melvill & Standen, 1903)
 Orania dharmai Houart, 1995
 Orania ficula (Reeve 1848)
 Orania fischeriana (Tapparone-Canefri, 1882)
 Orania fusulus (Brocchi, 1814)
 Orania gaskelli (Melvill, 1891)
 Orania livida (Reeve, 1846)
 Orania maestratii Houart & Tröndlé, 2008
 Orania mixta (Houart, 1995)
 Orania nodosa (Hombron & Jacquinot, 1841)
 Orania nodulosa (Pease, 1869)
 Orania pachyraphe (E. A. Smith, 1879)
 Orania pacifica (Nakayama, 1988)
 Orania pholidota (Watson, 1883)
 Orania pleurotomoides (Reeve, 1845)
 Orania pseudopacifica Houart, Zuccon & Puillandre, 2019
 Orania purpurea (Kuroda & Habe, 1961)
 Orania rosadoi Houart, 1998
 Orania rosea Houart, 1996
 Orania serotina (A. Adams, 1853)
 Orania simonetae Houart, 1995
 Orania subnodulosa (Melvill, 1893)
 Orania taeniata Houart, 1995
 Orania taiwana (K.-Y. Lai & B.-S. Jung, 2012)

 † Orania turrita (Borson, 1821) 
 Orania walkeri (G.B. Sowerby III, 1908)
 Orania xuthedra (Melvill, 1893)
Species brought into synonymy
 Orania albozonata (E. A. Smith, 1890): synonym of Enginella albozonata (E. A. Smith, 1890)
 Orania alexanderi Houart, 1985: synonym of Orania xuthedra (Melvill, 1893)
 Orania birileffi (Lischke, 1871): synonym of Bedevina birileffi (Lischke, 1871)
 Orania grayi (Dall, 1889): synonym of Cytharomorula grayi (Dall, 1889)
 Orania infans (E. A. Smith, 1884): synonym of Spinidrupa infans (E. A. Smith, 1884)
 Orania ornamentata Houart, 1995: synonym of Cytharomorula ornamentata (Houart, 1995) (original combination)

References

 Houart, R.: Zuccon, D. & Puillandre, N. (2019). Description of new genera and new species of Ergalataxinae (Gastropoda: Muricidae). Novapex. 20 (Hors série 12): 1-52.

External links
 Pallary, P. (1900). Coquilles marines du littoral du département d'Oran. Journal de Conchyliologie. 48(3): 211-422.

 
Ergalataxinae
Gastropod genera